Stetson T. Allie (born March 13, 1991) is an American professional baseball who is currently a free agent. Allie was drafted by the Pittsburgh Pirates in the 2nd round of the 2010 Major League Baseball draft.

Career

Pittsburgh Pirates
Allie attended St. Edward High School in Lakewood, Ohio, where he played for the school's baseball team. Allie fell in the 2010 Major League Baseball Draft due to his high bonus demands and commitment to the University of North Carolina. However, the Pittsburgh Pirates selected Allie, a pitcher who had thrown as high as 100 MPH (102 MPH unofficially), in the second round of the draft and signed him for a $2,250,000 signing bonus.

As a pitcher, he was named the #79 prospect in baseball by Baseball America prior to the 2011 season. However, in 2011, with the State College Spikes, he walked 29 batters in 26 innings, and in 2012, with the West Virginia Power, he walked 8 batters in 2/3 of an inning. Allie's severe control problems caused the Pirates to convert Allie into an infielder in June 2012.

In June 2012, Allie started his career as a position player with the Gulf Coast League Pirates. Playing for the West Virginia Power of the Class A South Atlantic League in 2013, he hit six home runs in the first 14 games of the season. He was promoted to the Bradenton Marauders of the Class A-Advanced Florida State League, and began the 2014 season with the Altoona Curve of the Class AA Eastern League.

Los Angeles Dodgers
On November 14, 2016, Allie signed a minor league deal with the Los Angeles Dodgers, who assigned him to the Double-A Tulsa Drillers of the Texas League to start the 2017 season. In 32 games for the Drillers, he hit only .216. The decision was then made to convert him back to pitching. He pitched in 11 games in the Dodgers system after that (eight for the rookie level Arizona League Dodgers, two for the Rancho Cucamonga Quakes and one for the Oklahoma City Dodgers) and did not allow an earned run in 11 innings over that period. In 2018 he pitched in 22 games for the Quakes, 11 for the Drillers and 13 for the Oklahoma City Dodgers, with a 7–1 record and 5.57 ERA.

Boston Red Sox
In February 2020, Allie signed a minor league contract with the Boston Red Sox. Allie did not play in a game in 2020 due to the cancellation of the minor league season because of the COVID-19 pandemic. He became a minor-league free agent on November 2, 2020.

Tampa Bay Rays
On December 24, 2020, Allie signed with the Kansas City T-Bones, who later rebranded as the Kansas City Monarchs of the American Association of Professional Baseball. On February 10, 2021, Allie signed a minor league contract with the Tampa Bay Rays organization that included an invitation to Spring Training. Allie struggled to an 8.00 ERA between the Triple-A Durham Bulls and rookie-level Florida Complex League Rays before being released by the organization on August 4.

References

External links

1991 births
Living people
People from Olmsted Falls, Ohio
Baseball players from Ohio
State College Spikes players
West Virginia Power players
Gulf Coast Pirates players
Bradenton Marauders players
Altoona Curve players
Venados de Mazatlán players
American expatriate baseball players in Mexico
Tulsa Drillers players
Arizona League Dodgers players
Oklahoma City Dodgers players
Rancho Cucamonga Quakes players
St. Edward High School (Lakewood, Ohio) alumni